Kingston Shipyards was a Canadian shipbuilder and ship repair company that operated from 1910 to 1968. The facility was located on the Kingston waterfront property known as Mississauga Point, which is the now the site of the Marine Museum of the Great Lakes at Kingston.

History

Marine Railway Company

In 1836 the British Board of Ordnance transferred control of the Kingston waterfront property, Mississauga Point, from the military to local businessmen. John Counter, Henry Gildersleeve, and Thomas Kirkpatrick created the Marine Railway Company to service the shipping traffic on Lake Ontario and the St. Lawrence River.

By 1839 the company had built a small dry dock, an engine foundry, two wharves and a marine railway. In 1848 a large three storey warehouse was constructed. Steam power was added to the marine railway in 1851 and additional stone outbuildings were constructed in 1854.

The Marine Railway Company advertised its facilities in 1862. The company claimed to own a marine railway with steam sawmill, workshops and offices, sixteen stone cottages, a large foundry known as the Ontario foundry, five large three and four storey fireproof warehouses and many wharves. Over two hundred men were employed to overhaul and service seven vessels at a time. At its time, it was the largest shipbuilding effort west of Quebec.

First World War

In 1910 Collingwood Shipyards opened a subsidiary shipbuilding and repair plant in Kingston. The government dry dock was rented and purchased, and three government contracts for ships were secured. Several small jobs followed until the First World War in 1915. War contracts required 8 minesweepers for the Royal Navy and the Royal Canadian Navy and thus the workforce increased to over 1000 workers.

Depression

Manager D. Thompson headed the firm during the Great Depression keeping a crew of six to eight men onsite. Parties of workers were hired on the spot on a jobbed basis.

Second World War

The first three corvettes were ordered to be constructed in 1940. This was the first construction contract since 1923. The workforce grew to over 1500 as corvette and minesweeper construction progressed. The last wartime contracts were for seven seagoing steam tugs which were finished after the war had ended.

Canada Steamship Lines takes over

In 1947 the yard was bought by the Canada Steamship Lines. This rejuvenated the shipyard business as the fleet of canallers owned by the Canada Steamship Lines provided repair work for the yard. The Kingston Shipyards throughout the 1950s was occupied with building tugs, barges and pontoons.

Final years

The opening of the St. Lawrence Seaway in 1959 made the fleet of canallers obsolete. With no canaller fleet wintering in Kingston, the yard lost the majority of its work. In 1967 Canada Steamship Lines shut down the site and all the equipment was to be sold or transferred to Collingwood Shipyards. The property was sold in 1968, and in 1974 acquired by the establishment of the current Marine Museum of the Great lakes at Kingston.

Shipbuilding history

References

Shipbuilding companies of Canada
Defunct companies of Ontario
Defunct manufacturing companies of Canada
Companies based in Kingston, Ontario
History of shipbuilding in Ontario
Manufacturing companies established in 1910
Manufacturing companies disestablished in 1968
1910 establishments in Ontario
1968 disestablishments in Ontario